Daniel Torres may refer to:

 Daniel Díaz Torres (1948–2013), Cuban film director and screenwriter
 Daniel Torres (cartoonist) (born 1958), Spanish comics artist and writer
 Daniel Fernández Torres (born 1964), bishop for the Roman Catholic Diocese of Arecibo
 Daniel Torres García (born 1968), Mexican politician
 Daniel Torres (Costa Rican footballer) (born 1977), Costa Rican football defender
 Dani Torres (Spanish footballer) (born 1984), Spanish football centre-back
 Dani Torres (Colombian footballer) (born 1989), Colombian football defensive midfielder
 Daniel Torres Samaniego (born 1991), Mexican swimmer
 Daniel Torres (American politician), elected member of the New Paltz Town Council